Warwick Township is the name of three places in Pennsylvania, USA:

 Warwick Township, Bucks County, Pennsylvania
 Warwick Township, Chester County, Pennsylvania
 Warwick Township, Lancaster County, Pennsylvania

See also 
 Warwick Township (disambiguation)

Pennsylvania township disambiguation pages

de:Warwick Township